Adventures in Babysitting (also known as A Night on the Town in certain countries) is a 1987 American teen comedy film written by David Simkins and directed by Chris Columbus in his directorial debut. It stars Elisabeth Shue, Keith Coogan, Anthony Rapp, and Maia Brewton, and features cameos by blues singer/guitarist Albert Collins and singer-songwriter Southside Johnny Lyon.

Plot
After her boyfriend Mike cancels their anniversary date, seventeen-year-old Chris Parker invites her friend Brenda over to her Oak Park, Illinois, house to cheer her up, but is convinced by her mother to babysit the Andersons' daughter, eight-year-old Sarah, while they attend a party in downtown Chicago. Sarah's fifteen-year-old brother Brad is supposed to spend the night at his friend Daryl Coopersmith's house, but he changes his mind when he discovers that Chris is the sitter. After receiving a frantic phone call from Brenda, who ran away to a downtown bus station, Chris plans to go alone to pick her up, but is coerced by Brad, Sarah, and Daryl to take them with her. On the freeway, their station wagon suffers a flat tire and they are picked up by a tow truck driver, "Handsome" John Pruitt, who offers to pay for the tire when Chris realizes she left her purse at the Andersons'. En route, Pruitt receives a call from his boss Dawson with evidence that his wife is cheating on him, and he rushes to his house to confront the infidelity; Chris' mother's car is damaged when Pruitt accidentally shoots out the windshield while aiming to kill his wife's lover with his snubnosed revolver. Chris and the kids hide in the adulterer's Cadillac, which is then stolen by a car thief named Joe Gipp.

Reaching their hideout in the South Side, the kids realize they have stumbled upon a large multi-state stolen car operation, and Joe is chided by Graydon, the operation's second-in-command, for bringing witnesses. They are detained in an upstairs office but escape. They enter a blues club where the band on stage refuses to let them leave until they perform a blues number. The group spontaneously recounts their events while accompanied on instrument by Albert Collins, causing the audience to sing along and happily applaud. They leave just as Joe, Graydon and his boss Bleak arrive in the club, whose owners stall them.

Brad tells Chris about his feelings toward her, and is disappointed to learn he is too young for her. After separating Daryl from a streetwalker who is a runaway, Chris is reminded of Brenda. They are found and chased again by Graydon and Bleak but escape on the Chicago "L" train and wind up in the middle of a gang fight. Brad is injured when one of the gang leaders throws a switchblade onto his foot. They take Brad to the university hospital, where he receives a stitch. They run into Pruitt, who is now on the run from his earlier attacks; he tells the kids he replaced the windshield, but Dawson wants $50 for the tire. The kids come across a fraternity house party, and Chris becomes attracted to Dan Lynch, a gentleman who learns of Chris' problem and donates $45. He takes them to Dawson's Garage and drops them off.

When they find Dawson, his blond hair and sledgehammer led Sarah to believe he is Thor, her favorite superhero. He denies them their car because of the $5 shortage, but when Sarah offers him her toy Thor helmet, he changes his mind and lets them go. Meanwhile, Joe Gipp tells Bleak about their troubles, and the three are waiting to follow them. The kids find the restaurant where Mike was supposed to take Chris and discover he is with another girl. Sarah slips away to look at a toy store while Chris yells at Mike. Brad stands up for Chris but is reluctant to hit Mike, so Daryl kicks Mike into a table, ruining his dinner and causing a commotion. Bleak spots Sarah, and Graydon chases her to an office building where she hides; the others note her disappearance and follow, accidentally coming across the Andersons' party. After Sarah climbs out an open window and slides down the building, Chris spots her and they run upstairs to help.

After the group pulls Sarah from outside the window, Bleak confronts them. Joe knocks his boss out, before giving him a Playboy magazine that Daryl had stolen, which contained important notes that the criminals wanted. The kids retrieve Brenda from the bus station and rush home, narrowly avoiding the Andersons on Interstate 290. Once home, Chris cleans up the mess left earlier, settling into place just as the Andersons enter. As Chris says goodnight to the kids, Brad tells her he understands about her not feeling the same way he did about her and tells her that if they see each other at school the next day, it is okay if she ignores him. However, Chris smiles and tells him she does not ignore her friends. Just as Chris is leaving, Dan arrives with one of Sarah's missing skates. He says he needs a babysitter and is disappointed when Chris says she is retired; he confesses the babysitter was for him. Chris decides that retirement can wait and gladly agrees to babysit Dan. With Sarah's encouragement, Chris and Dan kiss outside as Brad closes the blinds.

In a post-credits scene, Graydon is shown standing on the ledge, still trying to find his way to safety.

Cast

 Elisabeth Shue as Christina "Chris" Parker
 Keith Coogan as Brad Anderson
 Anthony Rapp as Daryl Coopersmith
 Maia Brewton as Sarah Anderson
 Penelope Ann Miller as Brenda
 Bradley Whitford as Mike Todwell
 Calvin Levels as Joe Gipp
 George Newbern as Dan Lynch, a college student
 John Chandler as Bleak, a mob boss
 Ron Canada as Graydon, Bleak's second in command
 John Ford Noonan as "Handsome" John Pruitt
 Albert Collins as himself; a player in a Chicago Blues club
 Vincent D'Onofrio as Dawson
 Southside Johnny as band leader at frat party
 Lolita Davidovich as LuAnn
 Clark Johnson as gang leader
 Andrew Shue as guy at frat party

Production
For his directorial debut, Columbus said he reviewed a hundred scripts. He chose Adventures in Babysitting because he felt comfortable with its scale. Paramount Pictures had a right of first refusal but demanded Molly Ringwald be cast in the lead. Over 150 actresses auditioned for the lead role, including Valerie Bertinelli. Shooting took place in Toronto, Chicago, and Los Angeles in early 1987.

Release
The film earned $34.4 million in the United States, which the Los Angeles Times attributed to a new ad campaign.

Home media
The film has been released on VHS and Betamax, LaserDisc, DVD and Blu-ray formats.  In the United States, it received a VHS release by Touchstone Home Video on July 14, 1992. It was released on DVD for the first time on January 18, 2000, by Touchstone Home Video. A 25th anniversary edition Blu-ray was released on August 7, 2012.

Although it may still be referred to as A Night on the Town on television airings in the United Kingdom, the film was released on rental VHS in the UK under its original title. The VHS was re-released on October 21, 2002 in the United Kingdom by Cinema Club and it received a 15 certificate by the BBFC for strong language and sexual references. It was previously released in an edited PG certificate for family viewing. It was released on DVD in the United Kingdom on May 31, 2004, again uncut like the 15 certificate VHS. It has since been reduced to a 12 certificate.

The PG version currently streams on Disney+, where a notice advises it has been edited for content, primarily removing strong and offensive language.

Soundtrack album
In 2015, Intrada Records released an album from the film, featuring the score by Michael Kamen, including unused music and several of the songs heard in the film. It features "Then He Kissed Me" by the Crystals, "Babysitting Blues" by Albert Collins, "Twenty-Five Miles" by Edwin Starr, and "Just Can't Stop" by Percy Sledge.

"Babysitting Blues" song
In a 2021 interview in New York Magazine, Elisabeth Shue said performing the "iconic Babysitting Blues song," written by pop songwriter Mark Mueller and Robert Kraft (composer), was one of her "favorite experiences of all time."

Reception
On Rotten Tomatoes, the film holds an approval rating of 71% based on 45 reviews, with an average rating of 6.50 out of 10. The site's consensus states: "Sweet and spry, Adventures in Babysitting gets by on its amiable tone." On Metacritic, the film has a weighted average score of 45 out of 100, based on 11 critics, indicating "mixed or average reviews".

Roger Ebert of the Chicago Sun-Times gave Adventures in Babysitting two-and-a-half out of four stars. He cited the blues club sequence as the movie's best scene, but criticized the film for not doing more with its Black characters. He said the movie had "good raw material," but too many "unrealized possibilities." Gene Siskel of the Chicago Tribune rated the film three out of four stars, calling it "a genial, warm-hearted romp." He praised the performances of the young cast and called Elisabeth Shue "earnestly appealing," but criticized the movie for a lack of "social awareness." Both critics compared the film to Risky Business and Ferris Bueller's Day Off.

Unsold television pilot

The film was adapted into an unsold television pilot of the same name for CBS in 1989. The pilot was broadcast on Friday night, July 7 in the 8 p.m. timeslot. It starred Jennifer Guthrie (who would later co-star on Parker Lewis Can't Lose with Maia Brewton) as Chris, Joey Lawrence as Brad, Courtney Peldon as Sara, Brian Austin Green as Daryl, and Ariana Mohit as Brenda. The pilot overall, garnered CBS a 6.9 rating.

Cast

 Jennifer Guthrie as Christina "Chris" Parker
 Joey Lawrence as Brad Anderson
 Brian Austin Green as Daryl Coopersmith
 Courtney Peldon as Sara Anderson
 Ariana Mohit as Brenda
 Susan Blanchard as Joanna Anderson
 Dennis Howard as Robert Anderson
 Art Evans as Mr. Dukeman
 Rocky Giordani as Vince
 Jason Tomlins as Rick

Remake

Disney reportedly planned a remake for release in 2010. Raven-Symoné was to star in the remake, tentatively titled Further Adventures in Babysitting, but withdrew due to other projects. Miley Cyrus was also rumored to be attached to the project, but later denied involvement.

According to Variety, Tiffany Paulsen was writing the script. It was presumed that the remake was scrapped due to years of inactivity. However, on January 9, 2015, Disney Channel announced that the remake would go forward, with Sabrina Carpenter and Sofia Carson starring as competing babysitters. The film premiered on Disney Channel in the United States and Canada on June 24, 2016.

References

External links

 
  (unsold TV pilot)
 

1987 films
1987 comedy films
1987 directorial debut films
1980s chase films
1980s teen comedy films
American chase films
American teen comedy films
Fiction about child care occupations
1980s English-language films
Films directed by Chris Columbus
Films produced by Debra Hill
Films produced by Lynda Obst
Films scored by Michael Kamen
Films set in Chicago
Films shot in Chicago
Films shot in Los Angeles
Films shot in Toronto
Touchstone Pictures films
Television pilots not picked up as a series
CBS television specials
1989 television specials
1980s American sitcoms
Television series by ABC Signature Studios
English-language television shows
Live action television shows based on films
Television shows set in Chicago
Television series about teenagers
1980s American films